Björn S. Stefánsson (born 19. June 1937) is an Icelandic social scientist. He is a member of Norwegian Academy of Science and Letters.

Biography
Stefánsson graduated from high school in Reykjavik in 1956 and from Holar agricultural school on Island in 1957. He studied agricultural economy at Norwegian University of Life Sciences 1958-61. He was a research assistant at Norwegian University of Life Sciences 1965-68 and took his doctorate degree in 1968 (Lic.agric) which today compares to a Dr.scient. degree or a PhD. From 1968 he was a teacher at Hvanneyri landbruksskole and 1968-1976 he was head of the Icelandic statistical department. At the same time and after this he was free lance researcher and did economic research. In 1978 he was temporary professor at Nordiska institutet för samhällsplanering in Stockholm.

Bibliography

References

External links 

List of publications by Stefánsson, Björn S. in WorldCat.

Members of the Norwegian Academy of Science and Letters
Bjorn S. Stefansson
1937 births
Living people